Secondary Worlds is a book of four essays by W. H. Auden, first published in 1968.

The four essays in the book are based on the four T. S. Eliot Memorial Lectures that Auden delivered at the University of Kent in Canterbury in 1967. The titles of the four lectures are: "The Martyr as Dramatic Hero", "The World of the Saga", "The World of Opera", and "Words and the Word". 

The title of the book is taken from J. R. R. Tolkien's essay "On Fairy Stories".

The book is dedicated to Valerie Eliot.

References
Edward Mendelson, Later Auden (1999)

External links
The W. H. Auden Society

1968 books
Books by W. H. Auden
Faber and Faber books